Pink is a privately owned, national radio station and TV channel in Serbia. Pink is the leading commercial station in the Serbian television broadcast market. Pink's parent company is the Belgrade-based Pink International Company, a member of the Pink Media Group (PMG), which is owned by Željko Mitrović.

References

External links

Radio stations in Serbia
Television stations in Serbia
Radio stations established in 1993
Television channels and stations established in 1994
Television channels in North Macedonia